Eivind Stenersen Blehr (20 January 1881, in Lærdal – 27 July 1957) was a Norwegian minister in the NS government of Vidkun Quisling, from 1942 to 1944. In the Norwegian post-war legal purges he was convicted of treason and sentenced to 20 years of forced labour. He was the son of former prime minister Otto Blehr and feminist Randi Blehr.

References

1881 births
1957 deaths
People from Lærdal
Members of Nasjonal Samling
Government ministers of Norway
People convicted of treason for Nazi Germany against Norway